Dr. Géza Szénási (23 November 1919 – 21 February 1979) was a Hungarian jurist, who served as Chief Prosecutor of Hungary from 1956 to 1975.

Early life 
He graduated from the Budapest University in 1941. He joined the Hungarian Communist Party (MKP) in 1945. He was a member of the Central Committee of the Hungarian Socialist Workers' Party (MSZMP) between 1962 and 1975. He served as Hungarian Ambassador to Bulgaria from December 1975 until his death.

References
 Magyar Életrajzi Lexikon

1919 births
1979 deaths
Hungarian Communist Party politicians
Members of the Hungarian Working People's Party
Members of the Hungarian Socialist Workers' Party
Hungarian jurists
Ambassadors of Hungary to Bulgaria
Politicians from Budapest
Diplomats from Budapest